"You" is the second single by Ayumi Hamasaki. It was released on June 10, 1998.

Track listing
 "You"
 "You" (acoustic version)
 "You" (instrumental)

Re-release
This single was re-released on February 28, 2001, featuring four new songs.

Track listing
 "You"
 "You" (acoustic version)
 "Wishing" (Taku's Chemistry mix)
 "You" (Masters of Funk R&B remix)
 "You" (Orienta-Rhythm club mix)
 "You" (Dub's Uplifting mix)
 "You" (instrumental)

Live performances
June 6, 1998 - Utaban - You
June 19, 1998 - Music Station - You
June 20, 1998 - Pop Jam - You
December 25, 1998 - Music Station - You
December 14, 2002 - Ayuready? - You

Music video
The music video for "You" was directed by Takeishi Wataru. The video shows Hamasaki in different colored rooms. In each room something different is happening such as apples falling to the floor, Hamasaki playing a miniature piano, and her eating spaghetti. At the end of the video Hamasaki walks outside revealing a large house on the beach.

Chart positions

1Original version

²Re-release version

Certification: Gold

Oricon sales: 78,260 (original version)

References

External links
 "You" information at Avex Network.
 "You" re-release information at Avex Network.
 "You" information at Oricon.
 "You" re-release information at Oricon.

Ayumi Hamasaki songs
1998 singles
2001 singles
Songs written by Ayumi Hamasaki
1998 songs
Avex Trax singles
Song recordings produced by Max Matsuura